Canio is a name. Notable people with this name include:

 Canio of Atella, also known as San Canio and Saint Canius
 Cristián Canío (born 1981), Chilean football player
 Luigi De Canio (born 1957), Italian football player
 Paolo Di Canio (born 1968), Italian football player
 Virgilio Canio Corbo (1918–1991), Italian friar

Fictional characters
 Canio, from the opera Pagliacci

See also
 DeCanio
 Cania (gens)